Lyubomir Angelov (4 October 1912 – 24 October 1984) was a Bulgarian footballer and manager who played as a forward for the Bulgarian national team. With 26 goals in 44 caps for Bulgaria, he ranks as the nation's fifth-highest all-time top goalscorer.

Club career
He began to play football in his hometown clubs in Sofia such as Atletik, Sława and Szypce. At the age of 14, he moved to AS-23 Sofia, where he was nicknamed Старото, which he received from his schoolmates from the gymnasium. He was Champion of Bulgaria in 1931, when on the final matchday, they defeated FK Szypczenski Sokol by walkover. In 1941, he won the Tsar Cup, scoring twice in the final against Napredak Ruse to help his side to a 4–2.

After the seizure of power by the communist regime in the 1944 Bulgarian coup d'état, AS-23 Sofia was dissolved, while the main activists were subjected to repression for political reasons. Angelov, along with other leading AS-23 players, Spartak Podujane and Szypki Sofia, founded the band Czawdar Sofia, in which he performed until the end of 1947.

International career
He played in 44 matches for the Bulgaria national football team from 1931 to 1940, nine of which as its captain, scoring a then-national record of 26 goals. He was part of the Bulgaria team that won two back-to-back Balkan Cups in 1931 and in 1932, contributing with 1 and 2 goals respectively, but the highlight of his international career came in the 1935 Balkan Cup, where he was the top goal scorer with 6 goals which came in the form of two hat-tricks against Greece and Yugoslavia. With 14 goals in the Balkan Cup, he is the second-best top goal scorer in the competition's history, only behind Iuliu Bodola of Romania, who has 15. Angelov was also part of Bulgaria's team for their qualification matches for the 1938 FIFA World Cup.

Managerial career
After completing his competitive career, he became a coach, graduating from the State Coaching School (1948). Angelov took charge of the Bulgaria national team three times, first in 1948, then in 1950, and finally in 1953, leading the nation in 8 games. He also served as the head coach of the Bulgaria B team in 23 games between 1949 and 1959 and the youth (junior) team in 13 games between 1960 and 1962.

He was the coach of Spartak Sofia twice (1949–1956, 1966–1968) and again twice with Łokomotiv Sofia (1957, 1964), and was also employed in the training staff of Spartak-Levski Sofia, where he was assistant to Rudolf Vytlačil and Yoncho Arsov. Between 1964 and 1966, he worked in Syria, creating the structures of the local football league and the player training system.

International goals
''Bulgaria score listed first, score column indicates score after each Angelov goal.

Honours

Club
AS-23 Sofia

Bulgarian State Football Championship:
Champions (1): 1931

International
Bulgaria

Balkan Cup:
Champions (2): 1931 and 1932
Runners-up (2): 1935 and 1936

Individual
Top goalscorer of the 1935 Balkan Cup with 6 goals

References

External links
 

1912 births
1984 deaths
Footballers from Sofia
Bulgarian footballers
Bulgaria international footballers
Association football forwards
Bulgarian football managers
Bulgaria national football team managers